Ice Castles is a 2010 American direct-to-DVD sports romantic drama film directed by Donald Wrye and starring Taylor Firth and Rob Mayes.  It is a remake of the 1978 film of the same name, which was also directed by Wrye.

Plot
Lexi Winston lives on an Iowa farm with her father. She has a boyfriend named Nick who plays hockey in college. Lexi's skating talent attracts the attention of a coach who wants to take her to Boston and train her to win championships. Lexi works hard and comes in second in regionals, but she misses Nick. However, her coach considers the boyfriend a distraction and won't even let her mention him to the press. In sectionals, Lexi wins the competition and is ready to go the nationals, but she takes a break from an event where she is supposed to meet with those who can further her career, going outside to just skate for fun. She falls and hits her head, which causes her to go blind. Miracles do happen, she is told, but this is her life for now. Nick has quit the hockey team because the professional teams are not interested in him, and comes back to Iowa to spend time with Lexi. Lexi's condition is kept secret from the public, and while she doesn't believe she will skate again, her father and her boyfriend have to urge her just to get out of bed. Eventually, Lexi is willing to try skating again. After some training, she is actually capable of competing again, and she goes to the national competition, with the public unaware she is blind.

Cast
Taylor Firth as Alexis "Lexi" Winston
Rob Mayes as Nick
Henry Czerny as Marcus
Morgan Kelly as Aiden Reynolds
Molly Oberstar as Carrie Turner
Michelle Kwan as National Rinks Commentator #1

Production
Taylor Firth, who had no prior acting experience, earned her role when she impressed executives at Sony Pictures after they saw a 2007 YouTube video of her ice skating.

The film was shot in Halifax, Nova Scotia.

Notable figure skaters Sandra Bezic and David Wilson served as choreographers for the skating scenes.

Lynn-Holly Johnson, who played as Lexie in the original movie, filmed a cameo in the remake, but her scene was cut.

References

External links
 
 

2010 films
2010 direct-to-video films
2010 romantic drama films
American direct-to-video films
American romantic drama films
American sports drama films
Remakes of American films
Stage 6 Films films
Sony Pictures direct-to-video films
Films directed by Donald Wrye
Films about blind people
Figure skating films
Films shot in Halifax, Nova Scotia
2010s English-language films
2010s American films